Marolče is a small settlement in the Municipality of Ribnica in southern Slovenia. It lies north of Sveti Gregor, just off the main road to Velike Lašče. The entire Municipality of Ribnica is part of the traditional region of Lower Carniola and is now included in the Southeast Slovenia Statistical Region.

References

External links

Marolče on Geopedia

Populated places in the Municipality of Ribnica